The Silent Voice is a four-act play by Jules Eckert Goodman adapted from the short story The Man Who Played God by Gouverneur Morris. The play was produced by Charles Frohman and made its Broadway debut at the Liberty Theatre on December 29, 1914. The Silent Voice closed on March 19, 1915 after a run of 71 performances and later was taken on tour. Morris’ story also served as the basis for four motion pictures produced between 1915 and 1955.

Original Broadway cast 
 Wade Boteler as Williamson
 Esther Cornell as Young Girl
 Winona Dennison as Old Woman
 Ruth Farnum as Jennie
 Florence Fisher as Marjorie Blair
 George Gaul as Bobby De Lorme 
 Philip Leigh as Billy
 Owen Meech as Spring
 Walter F. Scott as Old Man
 Otis Skinner as Montgomery Starr
 Mrs. Otis Skinner (Maud Durbin) as Mildred Hallam
 Harry Sothern as Young Man
 William Willson as Policeman
 Eugenie Woodward as Heloise De Lorme

Plot
The Silent Voice tells the story of Montgomery Starr, an amateur musician of means, who becomes embittered after the loss of his hearing and the discovery that his young wife married him out of a sense of duty and that her true love was his nephew Bobby. Feeling dejected, Starr retreats to the roof of his mansion where, with the aid of binoculars, he spends his time watching people in a nearby park. An accomplished lip reader, Starr soon realizes that others were as unhappy as he and that he had the means to help some of those in want. To this end, Starr employs his valet to deliver the necessary aid. Eventually Starr's disposition improves, and by the end of the play, reconciles with his wife after his binoculars enabled him to observe her reject Bobby's request to elope.

See also
 The Silent Voice
 The Man Who Played God
 Sincerely Yours

References

External links
 Tha Man Who Played God by Gouverneur Morris

1914 plays
Broadway plays
American plays adapted into films